Sheri's Ranch is a legal brothel in Pahrump, Nevada. Unlike other brothels in the state, it styles itself as a resort, with upscale rooms and furnishings, sports bar, tennis courts, a spa and outdoor swimming pool.

In January 2001, the business was purchased by Chuck Lee, a retired Chicago homicide detective of 20 years, former owner of an AT&T retail store, and car dealership owner from Las Vegas, Nevada.

Author Lora Shaner, a former madam of the brothel, wrote a 1998 book about her experiences, Madam: Chronicles of a Nevada Cathouse, reissued and extended in 2001 as Madam: Inside a Nevada Brothel.

The brothel raised $7,000 in 2004 towards a senior citizens center so that they could still receive their "Meals on Wheels".

In 2005, Sheri's Ranch sought local zoning changes in Pahrump to build a 700-plus home  residential subdivision known as Mountain Shadows Resort.

Sheri's Ranch is adjacent to another legal brothel, the Chicken Ranch.

Media mentions 
Sheri's Ranch was featured in the BBC series Panorama about the importance of safe sex, preventative measures taken to avoid the contraction of HIV, and other STD/STIs by Nevada brothel sex workers.

Sheri's Ranch was featured on the A&E show, Gene Simmons Family Jewels while Gene Simmons was performing research for an upcoming novel. He interviewed Scarlett and Tawny Brie there as part of his research.

The brothel was featured in the Business Insider article "Inside a Nevada Brothel" by Dylan Love.

The Guardian featured Sheri's Ranch in a 2015 piece about the current state of the Nevada brothel industry written by Daniel Hernandez.

Sheri's Ranch was featured in the CMT documentary Morgan Spurlock Presents Freedom! The Movie.

An episode of the Vital Vegas Podcast  featured a room-by-room walk-through of Sheri's Ranch, including an interview with a madam and a sex worker.

The popular podcast Let Me Tell You About featured the brothel in an hour long episode, in which one of the hosts details losing his virginity to one of the sex workers.

Sheri's Ranch was featured in the Showtime original series Ray Donovan in the episode "Las Vegas."

Awards
Sheri's Ranch won CWMC's Brothel of the Year award in 2011 and 2012.

See also
 Prostitution in Nevada
 List of brothels in Nevada

References

External links
 
 Sheri's Ranch Official Blog

Brothels in Nevada
Pahrump, Nevada
Buildings and structures in Nye County, Nevada